Ariel John Litang Edu (born January 1, 2000) is a Cypriot-born Filipino college basketball player for the Toledo Rockets of the Mid-American Conference (MAC). He is a member of the Philippine men's national basketball team.

Early life and career
Edu was born in Cyprus to a Nigerian father Ayotunde Edu and Filipina mother Josie Litang-Edu. His mother is a native of Surigao City, Philippines but moved to England for work after finishing her education. She met Edu's father, a mathematics and physics professor. Standing , Ayotunde played basketball in his home country before becoming a high school coach in Wales.

Edu began playing basketball at the age of seven in the junior ranks of Cypriot club AEL Limassol. He also played soccer in his childhood but began focusing on basketball due to his exceptional height. After his family moved to England a few years later, Edu joined the Bristol Flyers cadet team and the Swansea Storm in the Wales League. With Swansea, he established himself as a top player at the under-16, under-18, and men's first division levels. With the Flyers, he trained with many former college basketball players. In 2017, Edu began playing for South Gloucestershire and Stroud College in Bristol, England, where he was considered one of the top prospects in the country while competing in the Elite Academy Basketball League (EABL). After the 2017–18 season, he was named EABL West Conference Defensive Player of the Year, averaging 18.6 points, 14.7 rebounds, and 2.7 blocks per game. In 2018, he was invited to a Basketball Without Borders camp in Los Angeles.

College career
On April 12, 2018, Edu signed a National Letter of Intent with the Toledo Rockets under head coach of Tod Kowalczyk. He played all 33 games, averaging 3.6 points, 3.9 rebounds and a team-high 1.7 blocks in 14.3 minutes per game. Edu recorded 57 blocks in the season, the most by a freshman in program history. He was named to the Mid-American Conference (MAC) All-Freshman Team. Edu missed his entire sophomore season recovering from a knee injury suffered at the 2019 FIBA Under-19 World Cup. In December 2020, Edu tore his meniscus and missed the rest of the season. On July 9, 2021, he tore his left ACL during a practice.

National team career
Edu was granted Filipino citizenship from a young age after difficulties in receiving a Cypriot passport, which made him eligible to play for the Philippines in FIBA competition. However, he still drew interest from the Nigeria, Cyprus and Great Britain. In 2017, Edu joined the Philippines at the FIBA 3x3 U18 World Cup in Chengdu, China. He debuted for the Philippines at the 2018 FIBA Under-18 Asian Championship in Bangkok, Thailand. In 6 games, Edu averaged 14.2 points, 11.5 rebounds, and 2.8 blocks per game, finishing with 4 double-doubles. He led his team to a fourth-place finish at the tournament, giving them a berth for the 2019 FIBA Under-19 World Cup. About two minutes into his first game at the Under-19 World Cup, Edu suffered a torn ACL and torn meniscus in his right knee, as well as a hairline fracture on his right femur. He missed the rest of the tournament with the injury.

Career statistics

College

|-
| style="text-align:left;"|2018–19
| style="text-align:left;"|Toledo
| 33 || 1 || 14.3 || .387 || .182 || .750 || 3.9 || .7 || .3 || 1.7 || 3.6
|-
| style="text-align:left;"|2020–21
| style="text-align:left;"|Toledo
| 2 || 2 || 23.5 || .143 || .0 || .0 || 7.0 || .5 || .0 || 2.0 || 1.0
|-
| style="text-align:left;"|2021–22
| style="text-align:left;"|Toledo
| 2 || 0 || 2.5 || .0 || .0 || .250 || .5 || .0 || .5 || .0 || 0.5
|- class="sortbottom"
| style="text-align:center;" colspan="2"|Career
| 37 || 3 || 13.4 || .177 || .061 || .333 || 3.8 || .4 || .3 || 1.2 || 1.7

References

External links
 Toledo Rockets bio

2000 births
Living people
Centers (basketball)
Filipino expatriate basketball people in the United States
Filipino men's basketball players
Filipino people of Nigerian descent
Power forwards (basketball)
Toledo Rockets men's basketball players